Psen monticola is a species of aphid wasp in the family Crabronidae. It is found in North America.

References

Further reading

External links

 NCBI Taxonomy Browser, Psen monticola

Crabronidae
Insects described in 1867